The 2015–16 Seton Hall Pirates women's basketball team represent Seton Hall University during the 2015–16 NCAA Division I women's basketball season. The Pirates, led by third head coach Anthony Bozzella, play their home games in Newark, New Jersey at the Walsh Gymnasium and are members of the Big East Conference. They finished the season 23–9, 12–6 in Big East play to finish in a tie for second place. They advanced to the semifinals of the Big East women's tournament where they lost to Creighton. They received an at-large bid of the NCAA women's basketball tournament where they lost to Duquesne in the first round.

Roster

Rankings
2015–16 NCAA Division I women's basketball rankings

Schedule

|-
!colspan=9 style="background:#0000FF; color:#D3D3D3;"| Exhibition

|-
!colspan=9 style="background:#0000FF; color:#D3D3D3;"| Non-conference regular season

|-
!colspan=9 style="background:#0000FF; color:#D3D3D3;"| Big East regular season

|-
!colspan=9 style="background:#0000ff; color:#D3D3D3;"| Big East Women's Tournament

|-
!colspan=9 style="background:#0000ff; color:#D3D3D3;"| Big East Women's Tournament

See also
 2015–16 Seton Hall Pirates men's basketball team

References

Seton Hall
Seton Hall Pirates women's basketball seasons
Seton Hall